Hesychotypa punctata is a species of beetle in the family Cerambycidae. It was described by Martins in 1979. It is known from Ecuador.

References

punctata
Beetles described in 1979